Etters Bridge, also known as Green Lane Bridge, is a historic Pratt truss bridge in Lower Allen Township, Cumberland County and Fairview Township, York County, Pennsylvania.  It was built in 1889, and measures  and  overall. The wrought iron bridge was designed and constructed by Dean & Westbrook. The Phoenix Bridge Company fabricated the superstructure.  The bridge crosses Yellow Breeches Creek.

It was added to the National Register of Historic Places in 1986.

References

Road bridges on the National Register of Historic Places in Pennsylvania
Bridges completed in 1889
Bridges in Cumberland County, Pennsylvania
Bridges in York County, Pennsylvania
National Register of Historic Places in York County, Pennsylvania
Wrought iron bridges in the United States
Pratt truss bridges in the United States